Justice LeGrand may refer to:

John Carroll LeGrand, chief judge of the Maryland Court of Appeals
Clay LeGrand, associate justice of the Iowa Supreme Court